Carlos Santana Morales  (born 12 June 1953) is considered one of the best Costa Rican football midfielders during the 1970s and 1980s.

Club career
He played his entire career for Deportivo Saprissa, and was the team's captain for several seasons. Santana was a very quick, and talented player, with awesome shooting and passing skills. He played in 419 league games for the club.

Santana helped Saprissa win 7 national titles during the 1970s and 1980s, and was part of the legendary Saprissa team that won 6 national championships in a row during the 1970s.

International career
He played with Costa Rica's national team as well, and was the captain of the team that beat then 1982 FIFA World Cup champions Italy in the 1984 Olympics in Los Angeles.

Managerial career
After his retirement, Santana briefly coached Saprissa, but was dismissed after 4 months in September 1999 and has worked with both Saprissa's minor league system, as well coaching several Costa Rican U-17 and U-20 national teams. He also managed second division Uruguay and Belén.

Personal life
Santana's son Ariel is also a professional football player.

References

1953 births
Living people
Association football midfielders
Costa Rican footballers
Costa Rica international footballers
Costa Rican football managers
Olympic footballers of Costa Rica
Footballers at the 1984 Summer Olympics
Deportivo Saprissa players
Deportivo Saprissa managers